Blue Stem was a small settlement in Fairview Township, Russell County, Kansas, United States.

History
Blue Stem was issued a post office in 1877. The post office was moved to Lucas in 1887.

References

Former populated places in Russell County, Kansas
Former populated places in Kansas